A PICK chart is a Lean Six Sigma tool, for organizing process improvement ideas and categorizing them during the Identify and Prioritize Opportunities Phase of a Lean Six Sigma project.

Use
PICK charts are a method to prioritize a number of action items or problem solving ideas. A pick chart allows visual comparison of action items relative to their impact to the problem being addressed vs. the ease/cost of implementation. In VERY rudimentary terms, PICK charts are a Return On Investment (ROI) method.

When faced with multiple improvement ideas a PICK chart may be used to determine the most useful.  There are four categories on a 2*2 matrix; horizontal is scale of payoff (or benefits), vertical is ease of implementation.  By deciding where an idea falls on the pick chart four proposed  project actions are provided; Possible, Implement, Challenge and Kill (thus the name PICK).

Low Payoff, easy to do - Possible 
High Payoff, easy to do - Implement 
High Payoff, hard to do - Challenge 
Low Payoff, hard to do - Kill 

The vertical axis, representing ease of implementation would typically include some assessment of cost to implement as well. More expensive actions can be said to be more difficult to implement.

Sample PICK chart

References

External links
 PICK Chart Template
 Online PICK Chart tool for teams

Six Sigma